Yumnam Raju Mangang (born 3 July 1989) is an Indian professional footballer who plays as a defender for Delhi FC.

References

External links
 Indian Super League Profile.
 

1989 births
Living people
Footballers from Manipur
Indian footballers
Churchill Brothers FC Goa players
Pune FC players
NorthEast United FC players
FC Pune City players
Jamshedpur FC players
I-League players
Indian Super League players
Association football fullbacks